Hair dye stripping is a process used to rid the hair of unwanted deposited color.

Procedure
Hair dye stripping is a chemical process involving the application of a sulfur-based product to hair in order to remove deposited color.  Hair dye strippers raise sulfite levels to make hair more porous and reverse the oxidation of color molecules.  This breaks the bonds dyes form between one another and the hair shaft that were formed by oxidizing small hair color intermediates, shrinking the molecules and allowing hair color to be washed out of the hair.  Because of the chemical nature of hair dye strippers, they are effective on both newly dyed hair and older dye.

Note that this type of color correction is ineffective on hair lightened with hydrogen peroxide, as hair bleaching is an irreversible chemical reaction that oxidizes hair's melanin, effectively rendering it colorless.  Most color depositing dyes use a weak hydrogen peroxide-based developer, or oxidizing agent, so results may not match natural hair color.

Notes for usage
It is advisable to follow color removal with a clear color filler before attempting to color hair again because hair will be more porous and re-dyed hair may darken more intensely and quickly.
Additionally, hair dye stripping products often have a strong, lingering odor reminiscent of rotting eggs due to their sulfuric nature.

Caution
Hair dye strippers contain chemical irritants.  Avoid direct skin contact and use in well-ventilated areas.

References

Hair coloring